Josef Schleinkofer (March 19, 1910 in Munich – 1984) was a German boxer who competed in the 1932 Summer Olympics.

Amateur career
In 1932 he won the silver medal in the featherweight class after losing the final against Carmelo Robledo.

Olympic results 
1932 won the Featherweight silver medal at the Los Angeles Olympics. Results were:
Defeated John Keller (Canada) PTS
Defeated Gaspare Alessandri (Italy) PTS
Lost to Carmelo Ambrosio (Argentina) PTS

External links

References
 profile

1910 births
1984 deaths
Sportspeople from Munich
Featherweight boxers
Olympic boxers of Germany
Boxers at the 1932 Summer Olympics
Olympic silver medalists for Germany
Olympic medalists in boxing
German male boxers
Medalists at the 1932 Summer Olympics